Konti–Skan (also known as Kontiskan) is the name of high-voltage direct-current transmission line between Denmark and Sweden.

Technical description
Kontiskan is a bipolar HVDC scheme.  Pole 1 (Kontiskan 1) was originally built in 1965, using mercury arc valves and was able to transmit up to 250 megawatts (MW) of power with an operating voltage of 250 kV.  The original mercury arc scheme was taken out of operation and disconnected on 15 August 2006, being replaced by new equipment using thyristors with a power rating of 350 MW. Pole 2, the 1988-built Kontiskan 2, was built with thyristors from the outset and can transmit 300 MW with a voltage of 285 kV.

Route

On the Danish side, the converter station used as well by Konti–Skan 1 and 2 is close to Vester Hassing near Aalborg. This line, which is only in the proximity of the converter station and the cable terminal equipped with a ground conductor, was originally used by the high voltage pole of Konti–Skan 1 and from Vester Hassing until a point a few kilometres south of the cable terminal by the electrode line, which turned there eastwards to the ground electrode at Soera. Each of these cables has two copper conductors with a copper cross section of 310 square millimeters. One of these cables was used by Kontiskan 1 and one is used by Kontiskan 2. From the third cable, one conductor was used by Kontiskan 1 and the other is used by Kontiskan 2. Before the implementation of Konti–Skan 2 both conductors were switched parallel, today one conductor is used for the high voltage pole of Konti–Skan 1, while the other is used by that of Konti–Skan 2. Between Læsø and Sweden each high voltage pole of Konti–Skan uses a monopolar copper cable with a cross section of 1200 square millimetres.

On the first  of this line the pylons carry the high-voltage conductors of Kontiskan 1 and 2. East of Brännemysten they carry also the conductor of the electrode line like a ground conductor on the pinnacle, but of course insulated to the structure of the pylons. It comes from the common grounding electrode of Kontiskan 1 and 2 near Risø in the Baltic Sea and runs after a submarine/underground cable section ending at a cable terminal near Brattas northwards as pole line to the high voltage pole line of Konti–Skan at Brännemysten. The Swedish converters of Kontiskan were originally situated at different places: that of Kontiskan 1 originally at Stenkullen, east of Gothenburg and that of Kontiskan 2 and the thyristor replacement of Kontiskan 1 near Lindome south of Gothenburg and south of the route of Kontiskan 1. The last  of Konti–Skan 1 were installed on guyed aluminum framework pylons with an unusually low weight of only 800 kilograms. These pylons carried 2 conductors, the high-voltage pole and the electrode line of Konti–Skan 1 on insulators of equal length. The remaining parts of this power line were dismantled in 2012.

Shortly before the end of the line to Stenkullen, the line shared two pylons with the three-phase AC line from Stenkullen to Holmbokullen. Apart from the pylons at the terminal of HVDC Volgograd-Donbass at Volga-Hydroelectric Power Plant, these were the only pylons carrying AC and DC circuits.

Sites

Waypoints 

 Overhead Line in Denmark
 
 
 
 
 
 
 
 
 
 
 
 

 Overhead Line on Læsø
 
 
 
 
 
 
 
 

 Overhead Line from Swedish Coast to Lindome
 
 
 
 
 
 
 
 
 
 
 
 
 
 
 
 

 Overhead Line Lindome-Stenkullen
 
 
 
 
 
 
 
 
 
 
 
 
 
 
 
 
 
 
 
 
 
 
 
 
 
 
 
 
 
 
 
 
 
 
 

 Electrode Line in Sweden

See also
 Baltic Cable, cable between Germany and Sweden
 Estlink, cable between Estonia and Finland
 Fenno-Skan, cable between Finland and Sweden
 LitPol Link, cable between Lithuania and Poland
 SwePol, cable between Poland and Sweden
 NordBalt, a cable between Sweden and Lithuania

References

External links

 https://web.archive.org/web/20070205083032/http://www.abb.com/cawp/GAD02181/22F17C5B4CED084CC1256E27002B3C7D.aspx
 https://web.archive.org/web/20051115122606/http://www.transmission.bpa.gov/cigresc14/Compendium/KONTI.htm
 https://web.archive.org/web/20051115122606/http://www.transmission.bpa.gov/cigresc14/Compendium/Konti%20Pictures.pdf

Electrical interconnectors to and from the Nordic grid
Electrical interconnectors to and from the Synchronous Grid of Continental Europe
Connections across the Baltic Sea
Submarine power cables
HVDC transmission lines
Electric power infrastructure in Denmark
Electric power infrastructure in Sweden
Denmark–Sweden relations
Energy infrastructure completed in 1965
Energy infrastructure completed in 1988
1965 establishments in Denmark
1965 establishments in Sweden